Miami is the seventh studio album by former Guns N' Roses guitarist Izzy Stradlin, originally released on May 30, 2007.

Background
According to drummer Taz Bently, the album sessions date back to 2005–2006, describing them as "loose" and focused on "jamming the songs out a pinch more than normal." The album was re-released on July 24, as Izzy Stradlin and bassist JT Longoria remixed the album in Dallas' Nomad Studios for a "much louder and more powerful sounding" edition.

Track listing
All lyrics and music by Izzy Stradlin.

 "Tijuana" - 3:41
 "Buildings In The Sky" - 5:23
 "Let Go" - 5:26
 "Junior's Song" - 2:28
 "Partly Cloudy" - 9:30
 "Waiting" - 4:30
 "Bombs Away" - 3:53
 "Tuff Check" - 3:40
 "Phone" - 3:19
 "Everythings Alright" - 7:38
 "FSO Ragga" - 6:54 (Not included on remix)

Personnel
Izzy Stradlin - vocals, rhythm guitar, lead guitar on "Phone"
Rick Richards - lead guitar
JT Longoria - bass guitar
Taz Bentley - drums
Joey Huffman - keyboards

2007 albums
Izzy Stradlin albums